The BMW E9 is a range of coupés produced from 1968 to 1975. Initially released as the 2800 CS model, the E9 was based on the BMW 2000 C / 2000 CS four-cylinder coupés, which were enlarged to fit the BMW M30 six-cylinder engine. The E9 bodywork was built by Karmann.

As a racing car, the E9 was very successful in the European Touring Car Championship and the Deutsche Rennsport Meisterschaft, especially the 3.0 CSL homologation model.

The E9 range was replaced by the E24 6 Series.

Predecessor 

The E9's predecessor are 2000 C and 2000 CS models, which were produced from 1965 to 1969 as part of the BMW New Class range.

Models

2800 CS 

The first of the E9 coupés, the 2800 CS, replaced the 2000 C and 2000 CS in 1968. The lead designer was Wilhelm Hofmeister. The wheelbase and length were increased to allow the engine bay to be long enough to accommodate the new straight-six engine code-named M30, and the front of the car was restyled to resemble the E3 sedan. The rear axle, however, remained the same as that used in the lesser "Neue Klasse" models and the rear brakes were initially drums - meaning that the 2800 saloon was a better performing car, as it was also lighter. The CS' advantages were thus strictly visual to begin with. The 2800 CS used the  version of the engine used in the E3 sedans. The engine produced  at 6000 rpm.

Not only was the 2800 CS lighter than the preceding 2000 CS, it also had a smaller frontal aspect, further increasing the performance advantage.

At the 1969 Geneva Motor Show, BMW unveiled the "2800 Bertone Spicup" concept car. This model, which has a similar appearance to the 1967 Alfa Romeo Montreal, did not reach production.

3.0 CS/CSi 

The 3.0 CS has a 9.0:1 compression ratio, twin carburetors and produces  at 6000 rpm. The 3.0 CSi has a 9.5:1 compression ratio, Bosch D-Jetronic electronic fuel injection, and produces  at 5500 rpm. Transmission options were a 4-speed manual or a 3-speed automatic.

In the United States, 1974 models have protruding 5 mile per hour bumpers.

3.0 CSL 
Introduced in May 1972, the 3.0 CSL was a homologation special built to make the car eligible for racing in the European Touring Car Championship. 1,265 were built.

The "L" in the designation meant leicht (light), unlike in other BMW designations, where it meant lang (long). The lightness was achieved by using thinner steel to build the unit body, deleting the trim and soundproofing, using aluminium alloy doors, bonnet, and boot lid, and using Perspex side windows. The five hundred 3.0 CSLs exported to the United Kingdom were not quite as light as the others, as the importer had insisted on retaining the soundproofing, electric windows, and stock E9 bumpers on these cars. The CSL was not sold in the United States.

This was done in August 1972 to allow the CSL to be raced in the "over three litre" racing category, allowing for some increase in displacement in the racing cars. This final version of the 3.0 CSL was homologated in July 1973 along with an aerodynamic package including a large air dam, short fins running along the front fenders, a spoiler above and behind the trailing edge of the roof, and a tall rear wing. The rear wings were not installed at the factory, but were left in the boot for installation after purchase. This was done because the wings were illegal for use on German roads. The full aero package earned the racing CSLs the nickname "Batmobile".

The CSL competed in Group 2 form in the European Touring Car Championship, with CSL drivers winning the Drivers title six times in the years 1973 and 1975 to 1979. The CSL also competed in Group 5 Special Production guise, winning three rounds of the 1976 World Championship for Makes. In FIA Group 4 spec, notably when driven by Hans-Joachim Stuck (car featured in Enthusia Professional Racing), they competed against racing versions of the Porsche 911 and Ford Capri with some success.

2.5 CS 
The last version of the E9 to be introduced was the 2.5 CS in 1974. This was a response to the 1973 oil crisis, such that the buyer could choose the smaller, more economical engine. The engine, from the 2500 sedan, displaced  and produced  at 6000 rpm. Only 874 were made until the end of E9 production in 1975, and none were exported to the United States.

Motorsport 

In 1973, Toine Hezemans won the European Touring Car Championship in a 3.0 CSL and co-drove a 3.0 CSL with Dieter Quester to a class victory at Le Mans. Hezemans and Quester had driven to second place at the 1973 German Touring Car Grand Prix at Nürburgring, being beaten only by Chris Amon and Hans-Joachim Stuck in another 3.0 CSL. 3.0 CSLs would win the European Touring Car Championship again in every year from 1975 to 1979.

The 3.0 CSL was raced in the IMSA GT Championship in 1975, with Sam Posey, Brian Redman, and Ronnie Peterson winning races during the season.

The 3.5 CSL was built for Group 5 racing and BMW won three races in the 1976 World Championship for Makes with this model.

Art Cars 
The first two BMW Art Cars were 3.0 CSLs; the first was painted by Alexander Calder and the second by Frank Stella.

Production numbers

2015 3.0 CSL Hommage 
In 2015, BMW introduced the 3.0 CSL Hommage concept car at the Concorso d'Eleganza Villa d'Este. The car is a tribute to the 3.0 CSL. It has an inline-six engine with an  hybrid system in the rear of the car. As a homage to the original, the 3.0 CSL Hommage has a minimal interior to keep the weight as low as possible; carbon fibre and aluminium are used in the cockpit for the same reason. The Hommage has Laser-LED lights similar to those in the i8.And in August 2015, BMW introduced the BMW 3.0 CSL Hommage R concept car at the Pebble Beach Concours d'Elegance. The car celebrates both the 40th anniversary of BMW in North America and the racing success of the 3.0 CSL in 1975.

2023 3.0 CSL

Notes

References

External links

E9
E9
Rear-wheel-drive vehicles
Cars introduced in 1968
Karmann vehicles
Grand tourers